Siluria is a former town and now a neighborhood in Alabaster, Alabama, located in Shelby County, Alabama in the Birmingham, Alabama, metropolitan area. It was the home of a large cotton mill and company-built mill village which began operations in 1896 and finally closed in 1979. It was incorporated on 25 May 1954, but was later annexed by Alabaster in May 1971. It is named for the Silurian geological period because of rocks found there. A post office was established in 1872, and remained in operation until it was discontinued in 1972.

Demographics

Notable people
Jim Davenport, born in Siluria, major league baseball player
Willie Kirkland, born in Siluria, major league baseball player
Cathy O'Donnell, born Ann Steely in Siluria, actress, on July 6, 1923

References

External links
 Ancestry.com: Siluria Cotton Mill Company

Geography of Shelby County, Alabama
Unincorporated communities in Shelby County, Alabama
Neighborhoods in Alabama
Company towns in Alabama
Cotton mills in the United States
Populated places disestablished in 1971
Former municipalities in Alabama
Unincorporated communities in Alabama